Elections to the Preston City Council took place on 5 May 2011, the same day as other 2011 United Kingdom local elections. This was also the date of the 2011 United Kingdom Alternative Vote referendum. At this election, The Labour Party regained majority control of the council.

Councillors elected in 2007 Preston City Council election defended their seats this time, following the 2003 Preston Council election elections which began this current cycle. The wards fought in 2011 are to be contested again at the 2015 Preston City Council election with the results in that year compared directly with the results in this.

Other elections can be found at Preston local elections

2011 results

1 Candidate is defending seat won in 2007 under the ballot paper description Respect.

Ward Results

Ashton

Defending the north-western suburban electoral ward of Ashton is the Conservative Party with a majority in 2007 of 70

Brookfield

Labour are defending their 2007 win in Brookfield with a majority of 382

College

In the central north of Preston, to the south of Fulwood, the Conservatives are defending their 2007 win here with a majority of 523

Deepdale

The central eastern electoral ward of Deepdale is represented by an independent councillor whose majority was 275 over Labour in 2007

Garrison

Won by the Conservatives in 2003 and defended in 2007, their majority is 659 over the Liberal Democrats.

Greyfriars

The majority defended by the Conservatives is 1,030.

Ingol

Covering the Ingol and Tanterton areas of Preston,  this is in the northwest of the city. The Liberal Democrats won in 2007 with a majority of 469.

Larches

The western ward of Larches also incorporates Savick, in the northwest of the city. This year the Liberal Democrats are defending are majority of 117.

Lea

Coterminous to the civil parish of Lea and Cottam, this electoral ward is defended by the Conservatives with a majority of 429

=

Moor Park

For the 2011 election, the Labour Party defend a majority over the Conservatives of 360 votes.

Preston Rural East

The Rural East wards incorporates the Amounderness, Broughton and Grimsargh civil parishes in the north and east of the city. The current defending party with a majority of 786 for the Conservatives.

Preston Rural North

Reaching across the city of Preston, the large Preston Rural North ward includes the M6 and M55 motorways and acres of market towns, farming communities and rural areas. The boroughs of Fylde and Wyre border this northern ward, which is a three-member ward. The Conservative Party won in 2007 with the majority of 1,444.

Ribbleton

Ribbleton, is one of the largest in size, won four years ago by Labour over the Conservative Party with a majority of 394

Riversway

Riversway was won by Labour in 2007 over the Respect Party, winning by 191 votes.

Sharoe Green

The Sharoe Green ward is based on the former hospital and surrounding commuter belt environs. The 2011 election has the Conservative Party defending a majority of 639 over the Liberal Democrats.

St Matthews

The 2007 result in the St Matthews was a Labour win with a 336 majority

Town Centre

Formed by boundary changes prior to Preston being awarded city status, Town Centre is the largest non-rural ward in the borough. Michael Lavalette won the ward in 2007 under the Respect Party label although as of 2011 he sits in Preston Town Hall under the label "Independent Socialist".

Tulketh

Tulketh is a ward to the west of the city centre. Labour won over the Conservatives in 2007 with a lead of 230 votes.

University

Shaped around the outskirts of the city centre, this butterfly-wing shaped ward was won by Labour in 2003 with a majority of 116

References

See also
 Preston (UK Parliament constituency)

2011 English local elections
2011
2010s in Lancashire